Juliusz Fortunat Kossak (Nowy Wiśnicz, 15 December 1824 – 3 February 1899, Kraków) was an Austrian Polish historical painter and master illustrator who specialized in battle scenes, military portraits and horses.  He was the progenitor of an artistic family that spanned four generations, father of painter Wojciech Kossak and grandfather of painter Jerzy Kossak.

Life

Juliusz Kossak grew up in Lwów in the Austrian Kingdom of Galicia and Lodomeria. He obtained a degree in law at the Lwów University encouraged by his mother. At the same time he studied painting with Jan Maszkowski and Piotr Michałowski. Beginning in 1844 Kossak worked on commissions for the local aristocracy in Małopolska, Podolia and Wolyn. He married Zofia Gałczyńska in 1855 and together they left for Paris where they spent five years. His sons were born there, the twin brothers: Wojciech and Tadeusz (on New Year's Eve 1856–1857) and the younger Stefan in 1858. The family came to Warsaw in 1860 where Kossak obtained a position as the head illustrator and engraver for Tygodnik Illustrowany magazine. They moved to Munich for a year and in 1868 settled in Kraków blessed with five children already. Kossak bought a small estate there, known as Kossakówka, famed for artistic and literary salon frequented by Adam Asnyk, Henryk Sienkiewicz, Stanisław Witkiewicz, Józef Chełmoński and many others. Juliusz Kossak lived and worked there till the end of his life. In 1880 he was awarded the Cross of Order of Merit by Emperor Franz Joseph of Austria-Hungary for his lifetime achievements as an artist.

Work
Kossak exhibited his work on Polish soil and abroad since 1854. His preferred medium was watercolour, both in smaller and larger formats. He was the precursor of a Polish school of battle-scene painting, with his main subject matter revolving around what was of great concern to Poles opposing the military occupation of their country. He was the author of over a dozen panoramic paintings depicting Polish cavalry in battle and on military actions against foreign invaders.

Kossak produced also a series of portraits in oil for Polish noble families including Fredro, Gniewosz, Tyszkiewicz, Lipski and Morstin clan. His rustic and pastoral scenes included horse fairs, country weddings, winter hunting excursions, mythological scenes and horse stables. He also produces a series of illustrations of Polish epic literature such as Pan Tadeusz by Adam Mickiewicz, novels of Henryk Sienkiewicz, works by Wincenty Pol, Jan Chryzostom Pasek and others. He designed various honorary medals for Kraków foundries.

Gallery

Bibliography
Maciej Masłowski: Juliusz Kossak, Warsaw 1984, ed. „Auriga” - Wydawnictwa Artystyczne i Filmowe (Art and Film Publishers, 2nd ed. - 1986, 3rd ed. - 1990) .

See also

Wojciech Kossak (1857–1942), painter, son of Juliusz Kossak
Jerzy Kossak (1886–1955), painter, Juliusz Kossak's grandson, Wojciech Kossak's son, father of painter and poet Gloria Kossak (1941–1991)
Zofia Kossak-Szczucka (1889–1968), novelist, Juliusz Kossak's granddaughter and daughter of Wojciech Kossak's twin brother Tadeusz Kossak
Maria Pawlikowska-Jasnorzewska (1891–1945), poet, Juliusz Kossak's granddaughter, daughter of Wojciech Kossak
Magdalena Samozwaniec (1894–1972), writer, Juliusz Kossak's granddaughter and daughter of Wojciech Kossak
Gloria Kossak (1941–1991), painter and poet, Juliusz Kossak's great-granddaughter, daughter of Jerzy Kossak
Simona Kossak (1943-2007), biologist, Juliusz Kossak's great-granddaughter, daughter of Jerzy Kossak
"Kossak family", including second-, third- and fourth-generation painters
List of Poles

References

 Janusz Wałek, Józef Piłsudski Institute of America.  Painting in Poland. A brief summary. 2002–2005
 Władysław Zawadski, Juliusz Kossak,  Obrazy Rusi Czerwonej with illustrations by Juliusz Kossak, Poznań, Jan Konstanty Zupanski Publishing, 1869
 Gallery of Kossak's paintings
  Maciej Masłowski, Juliusz Kossak "Auriga" Wydawnictwa Artystyczne i Filmowe 1984, Warszawa, 
  Stefania Krzysztofowicz-Kozakowska, Kossakowie, Wydawnictwo Dolnośląskie, Wrocław, 2001, 
  Wojciech Kossak, Wspomnienia, Instytut Wydawniczy PAX, 1971

1824 births
1899 deaths
People from Bochnia County
People from the Kingdom of Galicia and Lodomeria
19th-century Polish painters
19th-century Polish male artists
Polish war artists
Burials at Rakowicki Cemetery
19th-century painters of historical subjects
19th-century war artists
Equine artists
Polish male painters
Participants of the Slavic Congress in Prague 1848